Enid is the ninth-largest city in the U.S. state of Oklahoma. It is the county seat of Garfield County. As of the 2020 census, the population was 51,308. Enid was founded during the opening of the Cherokee Outlet in the Land Run of 1893, and is named after Enid, a character in Alfred, Lord Tennyson's Idylls of the King. In 1991, the Oklahoma state legislature designated Enid the "purple martin capital of Oklahoma." Enid holds the nickname of "Queen Wheat City" and "Wheat Capital" of Oklahoma and the United States for its immense grain storage capacity, and has the third-largest grain storage capacity in the world.

History

In summer 1889, M.A. Low, a Rock Island official, visited the local railroad station then under construction, and inquired about its name. At that time, it was called Skeleton. Disliking the original name, he renamed the station Enid, after a character in Alfred Lord Tennyson's Idylls of the King. However, a more fanciful story of how the town received its name is popular. According to that tale, in the days following the land run, some enterprising settlers decided to set up a chuckwagon and cook for their fellow pioneers, hanging a sign that read "DINE". Some other, more free-spirited settlers, turned that sign backward to read, of course, "ENID". The name stuck.

During the opening of the Cherokee Outlet in the Land Run of 1893, Enid was the location of a land office which is now preserved in its Humphrey Heritage Village, part of the Cherokee Strip Regional Heritage Center. Enid, the rail station, (now North Enid, Oklahoma) was the original town site endorsed by the government. It was platted by the surveyor W. D. Twichell, then of Amarillo, Texas.

During the run, due to the Rock Island's refusal to stop, people leaped from the trains to stake their claim in the government-endorsed site. By the afternoon of the run, Enid's population was estimated at 12,000 people located in the Enid's  town plat. Enid's original plat in 1893 was 6 blocks wide by 11 blocks long consisting of the town square on the northwest end, West Hill  (Jefferson) school on the southwest end, Government Springs Park in the middle southern section, and East Hill (Garfield) school on the far northeast corner. A year later, the population was estimated at 4,410, growing to 10,087 by 1907, the year of Oklahoma statehood.

The town's early history was captured in Cherokee Strip: A Tale of an Oklahoma Boyhood by Pulitzer Prize-winning author Marquis James, who recounts his boyhood in Enid.

He writes of the early town:

Enid experienced a "golden age" following the discovery of oil in the region in the 1910s and continuing until World War II. Enid's economy boomed as a result of the growing oil, wheat, and rail industries, and its population grew steadily throughout the early 20th century in conjunction with a period of substantial architectural development and land expansion. Enid's downtown had the construction of several buildings including the Broadway Tower, Garfield County Courthouse, and Enid Masonic Temple. In conjunction with the oil boom, oilmen such as T. T. Eason, H. H. Champlin, and Charles E. Knox built homes in the area. Residential additions during this period include Kenwood, Waverley, Weatherly, East Hill, Kinser Heights, Buena Vista, and McKinley.  Union Equity, Continental, Pillsbury, General Mills, and other grain companies operated mills and grain elevators in the area, creating what is now the Enid Terminal Grain Elevators Historic District, and earning Enid the titles of "Wheat Capital of Oklahoma", "Queen Wheat City of Oklahoma," and "Wheat Capital of the United States"

Geography

Located in Northwestern Oklahoma, Enid sits at the eastern edge of the Great Plains.

Climate
Enid's weather conditions are characterized by hot summers, cold, often snowy winters, and thunderstorms in the spring, which can produce tornadoes. The greatest one-day precipitation total by an official rain gauge in Oklahoma was in Enid when  fell on October 11, 1973. Temperatures can fall below  in the winter, and reach above  in the summer. On average, the warmest month is July, January is the coolest month, and the maximum average precipitation occurs in June.

An ice storm struck Northwest Oklahoma in late January 2002. The storm caused over $100 million of damage, initially leaving some 255,000 residences and businesses without power. A week later, 39,000 Oklahoma residents were still without power. Enid, with its population of 47,000, was entirely without electricity for days. The Oklahoma Association of Electric Cooperatives reported over 31,000 electrical poles were destroyed across the state. The American Red Cross set up a shelter at Northern Oklahoma College.

Some other notable storms in Enid's history include:
October 11–13, 1973, Oklahoma's greatest urban rainfall on record occurred. Known as the "Enid flood", an intense thunderstorm was centered over Enid with rainfall accumulations between 15 and 20 inches within a  area. About  fell in three hours. Enid received , forcing residents to cut holes in rooftops to reach safety. Nine people died.
April 25, 2009, an EF-2 tornado damaged the Chisholm Trail Expo Center. No one was injured or killed.

Demographics

As of the 2020 census,  51,308 people resided in the city in 19,428 households. The population density was 693.9 per square mile. The racial makeup of the city was 75.9% White, 15.3% Hispanic or Latino Americans, 2.6% African American, 2.6% Native American, 1.3% Asian, 4.8% Pacific Islander, and 8.2% from two or more races.

The population consists of 25.2% children under the age of 18, 7.0% under the age of 5, and 14.8% 65 years of age or older. The average household size was 2.55 with 60.5% being owner occupied housing. 49.4% of people in Enid identify as female, 8.3% were foriegn born, 13.2% had some form of disability, and 3,365 were veterans.

Political affiliation
Enid has been predominantly a Republican stronghold since its days as part of Oklahoma Territory, owing to the influence of settlers from neighboring Kansas. Enid was named one of the top 10 most conservative cities in America in 2021 with over 60% of voters registering as Republicans. Several politicians have called Enid home, including Oklahoma Territory's last governor Frank Frantz; U.S. Representative Page Belcher; US Congressman and former Enid mayor, Milton C. Garber; Oklahoma Lieutenant Governor Todd Lamb; U.S. Representative George H. Wilson; and James Yancy Callahan, the only non-Republican territorial congressional delegate. In 2023 Enid elected a former organizer for Identity Evropa who was at the 2017 Charlottesville Unite the Right rally to its city commission.

Religious affiliation

Of the people in Enid, 61.9% claim affiliation with a religious congregation; 9.4% are Catholic, 39.2% are Protestant, 1.1% are Latter Day Saints and 12.2% are another Christian denomination. By 1987, there were 90 churches of 27 different denominations of Christianity. Downtown Enid boasts the world's largest fresh cut Christmas tree which is placed downtown in time for the annual Enid Lights Up the Plains festival.

Enid's Phillips University, although formally affiliated with the Disciples of Christ, was a product of religious collaboration between followers of the Disciples of Christ, Presbyterian Church, and Judaism. Although Phillips University has closed, Enid still has a number of private Christian schools, including St. Paul's Lutheran School, Oklahoma Bible Academy, St. Joseph Catholic School, and Emmannuel Christian School.

Enid has two Catholic congregations: St. Francis Xavier, founded in 1893, and St. Gregory, founded in 1971. St. Francis Xavier's Bishop Theophile Meerschaert was responsible for founding Calvary Catholic Cemetery in 1898. Enid is home to several Protestant churches. It has four Lutheran congregations: Immanuel, founded in 1899, Trinity, founded in 1901, St. Paul, founded in 1909, and Redeemer, founded in 1934.  Enid has several historically Black churches, including St. Stephen African Methodist Episcopal Church, First Missionary Baptist Church, and West Side Church of God in Christ (COGIC). The Southern Heights Ministerial Alliance brings local Black clergy together. Enid has two churches serving its Korean population, the Enid Korean Church of Grace and Peace United Methodist. Iglesia Cristiana El Shaddai, a Disciples of Christ congregation founded in 2001, serves the area Hispanic community. Enid Faith Ways Church is LGBTQ friendly.

Enid also has a small Bahá’í congregation that often meets in congregants' homes and serves some of Enid's Marshallese population.

Historically, between 1925 and 1930 Enid was home to a small Jewish congregation called Emanuel, which met at the Loewen Hotel, founded by Al Loewen, a local merchant who also served on the committee to create Phillips University. The Enid Cemetery also has a Jewish section where many of early Enid's Jewish merchants are interred, including the founders of Kaufman's Style Shop, Herzberg's Department Store, Newman Mercantile, and Meibergen and Godschalk, Enid's first clothing store. During the Oklahoma territorial era, Enid elected Jewish resident Joseph Meibergen in 1897 as mayor.

Enid is the home of two Masonic Lodges, the Enid Lodge #80 and the Garfield Lodge #501. The Enid Lodge has many Jewish members.

Marshallese population
In 2014 Enid was the city with the fourth largest Marshallese population in the United States.

A push factor from the Marshall Islands were nuclear testing at Bikini Atoll. Missionaries from Phillips University visited the Marshall Islands, and Marshallese students at Phillips were among the first settlers from the island country. There were also significant numbers who worked at food plants from Advance Foods, now Tyson Foods. There were others who worked at Walmart. The Compact of Free Association allowed Marshallese to begin moving to Enid sometime circa 1987. In 2022 there were 2,800 Marshallese in Enid.

Initially Enid's Marshallese were younger. By the 21st century many elderly Marshallese came for medical care, and many of them died at younger ages than other elderly people due to health problems stemming from fallout from the nuclear tests and from poor diets; the poor diets came from how the US bombings made traditional Marshallese food inaccessible due to radiation, so U.S. junk food rations became a major element in the Marshallese diet. Additionally, since 1996, Marshallese citizens were unable to get health programs offered by the federal government due to the Personal Responsibility and Work Opportunity Act changing relevant laws. The Oklahoma government has the ability to allow Marshallese citizens in its state borders to get access to these federal health programs, but it chooses not to do so.

It is common for Marshallese in Enid to frequently change residences. As many Marshallese have not obtained U.S. citizenship, they lack power in governance. Business ownership and management are not common among Marshallese in Enid.

In 2014 there were 381 students in Enid Public Schools who were Marshallese in English language learner programs, and two of the elementary schools had at least 25% of their total students being Marshallese ELL students. The district, in 2017, had two liaisons meant for the Marshallese population. In 2017, 200 of the students at Enid High School were Marshallese, and by 2014 the school had a student club where Marshallese students taught the overall student population about their culture. Longfellow Middle School also had such a club.

The Marshallese United Church of Christ is in Enid.

Economy

When Enid participated in the City Beautiful movement in the 1920s, Frank Iddings wrote the city song, "Enid, The City Beautiful". "You're right in the center where the best wheat grows and you've got your share of the oil that flows," his lyrics read. These were the early staples of the Enid economy. Enid's economy saw oil booms and agricultural growth in the first half of the 20th century. The Great Depression, however, caused both of these staples to lose value, and many businesses in Enid closed. However, Enid recovered, prospering and growing in population until a second wave of bad economic times hit in the 1980s, when competition with the local mall and economic factors led Enid's downtown area to suffer. Since 1994, Enid's Main Street program has worked to refurbish historic buildings, boost the local economy, and initiate local events such as first Friday concerts and holiday celebrations on the town square.

Companies with corporate headquarters in Enid:

 AdvancePierre Foods (prepared food products, primarily for institutional customers)
 Atwood Distributing, LP (farming supplies, hardware, pet supplies)
 Johnston Enterprises Inc. (grain processing, storage, and transportation; founded 1893)
 Pumpstar (manufacturer of concrete pumping equipment)
 Groendyke Transport (tank truck fleet operator; bulk liquid transport)

Companies with operations in Enid:

 The Koch Industries plant produces 10 percent of the anhydrous ammonia in the United States, a primary ingredient in fertilizer.
 Arctic Slope Regional Corporation provides base operations services at nearby Vance Air Force Base.
 Vertex provides aircraft maintenance services at nearby Vance Air Force Base.

Historical companies in Enid:

 Champlin Oil:  The company was founded in 1916 by H.H. Champlin and grew to operate service stations in 20 different states by 1944. In 1984, after a series of different owners, American Petrofina closed the operation. What remains is the H. H. Champlin Mansion, which is one of many Enid sites listed on the National Register of Historic Places.
 Geronimo Motor Company.

Water Pipeline to Enid from Kaw Lake

In 2020 the city of Enid began a multi-million dollar project to lay 70 miles of pipeline to transport 10 million gallons of water a day from Kaw Lake to a booster pump station in Enid. The pipeline is expected to provide a water to the city of Enid for the next 40–50 years. The city of Enid received $205 million in funding from the state of Oklahoma on December 15, 2020, as part of its water pipeline project, the city's most expensive project ever. On February 28, 2021, the U.S. Army Corps of Engineers announced their approval of a National Environmental Policy Act Environmental Assessment led by the City of Enid and Garver for the Enid Kaw Lake Water Supply Program. The USACE's Finding of No Significant Impact (FONSI) means that the program has taken a significant step toward construction set to begin in the first half of 2021. On June 3, 2021, the project's construction manager at-risk announced that construction had officially begun at the lake's intake facility in Osage County where work has begun on the vertical intake shaft, which then will micro-tunnel into the lake to gain access. The project's design engineering firm also announced that nearly all the necessary land also has been acquired for the 70-mile pipeline with 223 parcels of land accepted of the 230 total land parcels needed for the pipeline portion of the project.

Arts and culture

Enid is home to the annual Tri-State Music Festival which was started in 1932 by Russell L. Wiley, who was Phillips University band director from 1928 to 1934. From 1933 to 1936, Edwin Franko Goldman headlined the festival. The festival takes place each spring in Enid.

In the summertime, Enid's Gaslight Theatre hosts a production of Shakespeare in the Park, as well as year-round theater productions. The Enid Symphony Orchestra was formed in 1905 and is the oldest symphony in the state, performing year-round in the Enid Symphony Center. Enid's Chautauqua in the Park takes place each summer in Government Springs Park, providing five nights of educational performances by scholars portraying prominent historical figures. The Chautauqua program was brought to Enid in 1907 by the Enid Circle Jewish Chautauqua and is now produced by the Greater Enid Arts and Humanities Council.

Enid's Cherokee Strip Regional Heritage Center preserves the local history of the Land Run of 1893, Phillips University, and Garfield County. The museum originated as the Museum of the Cherokee Strip in the 1970s, and reopened on April 1, 2011. Enid also commemorates its land run history each September by hosting the Cherokee Strip Days and Parade. The Humphrey Heritage Village next to the museum offers visitors a chance to see the original Enid land office and other historical buildings.

Visitors to Enid's Railroad Museum of Oklahoma, located in the former Santa Fe Railway Depot, can see railroad memorabilia, explore historical trains, and watch model railroads in action. The Midgley Museum is operated by the Enid Masonic Lodge #80 and features the rock collection of the Midgley family. Leonardo's Discovery Warehouse, located in the former Alton Mercantile building in downtown Enid, is an arts and sciences museum, which features Adventure Quest, an outdoor science-themed playground. Simpson's Old Time Museum is a Western-themed museum by local filmmakers Rick and Larry Simpson. The pair closed their downtown business, Simpsons Mercantile, in 2006 to convert the building into a movie set and museum.

George's Antique Auto Museum features the sole existing Geronimo car, once manufactured in Enid. The Leona Mitchell Southern Heights Heritage Center and Museum records the history and culture of African Americans and Native Americans, featuring exhibits on Enid's former black schools (George Washington Carver and Booker T. Washington), and opera star Leona Mitchell. Enid also has 26 of the 32 sites on the National Register of Historic Places listings in Garfield County, Oklahoma.

Parks and recreation

Government Springs Park, also known as North Government Springs Park, was Enid's first park.  Originally a watering hole on the Old Chisholm Cattle Trail, the park is built around a lake and includes the Dillingham Gardens, picnic pavilions, playground equipment, a performing arts pavilion, and more.

South Government Springs Park contains a sports complex with football fields complete with lights, two softball complexes with lights, and two tennis complexes made up of four lighted courts each.

The City of Enid maintains 25 additional parks or facilities including two splash pads, a pool, a bike park and a bird sanctuary.

The Great Salt Plains State Park, Great Salt Plains Lake, and the Salt Plains National Wildlife Refuge are to the northwest.  Canton Lake is the southwest.   Sooner Lake is to the east.  Carl Blackwell Lake is to the southeast.

Sports

Enid has produced several athletes, including NFL football players Todd Franz, Steve Fuller, Ken Mendenhall, John Ward, Jeff Zimmerman, Jim Riley, and the CFL's Kody Bliss. Brothers Brent Price and Mark Price became NBA players, and Don Haskins is a Hall of Fame basketball coach. USSF soccer player Andrew Hoxie, Major League Baseball pitchers, Ray Hayward and Lou Kretlow, Olympian and runner, Chris McCubbins, and Stacy Prammanasudh, an LPGA golfer, all were born or lived in Enid.

Baseball
The Enid Harvesters (active from 1920 to 1924) were named as the 20th-best minor league farm team ever by Minor League Baseball. They had a 104–27 record in the 1922 season. The Harvesters, along with their earlier counterparts the Enid Railroaders, were members of the Western Association. During the 1951 season, the team was an affiliate of the Houston Buffaloes, and were known as the Enid Buffaloes to match.

The Enid Majors youth baseball team won the American Legion Baseball World Series in 2005.

Several Enid teams played in the National Baseball Congress championships, winning the championship in 1945 by the Army Air Field (runners up in 1943 and 1944), in 1940 and 1941 by the Champlins, and in 1937 by the Eason Oilers (runners up in 1938).

Phillips University baseball teams, coached by Enid native Joe Record, went to the NAIA World Series three times during his tenure as head coach (1952–1981). Record was the NAIA Coach of the Year in 1973, and was inducted into the NAIA Hall of Fame in 1975.

The Northern Oklahoma College Enid Jets baseball team were conference champions in 2002, 2003, 2005 and 2018. They were Region II champions in 2002, 2004, 2018, and runners up in 2009. They were Southwest District Champions in 2002 and also received third place in the NJCAA World Series in that 2002 and 2018.

Basketball
The Oklahoma Storm USBL franchise called Enid home. Through their eight years in Enid (2000–2007 seasons), they won their division more than once and the USBL Championship in 2002.

Football
The Enid High School Plainsmen have won six state football championships (1919, 1942, 1964, 1965, 1966, and 1983). They went to the Oklahoma State Championship football game in 2006 and lost to the Jenks Trojans.

The Phillips University football teams, coached by John Maulbetsch, beat the University of Oklahoma and University of Texas football teams and lost only one game in the 1918 and 1919 seasons. When Phillips defeated Texas 10–0 in Austin, Texas, in October 1919, the Longhorns had not lost a game since 1917.

The newest football team in Enid is the Enid Enforcers, a semiprofessional/minor-league team playing in the Central Football League. Their first season of play was in the spring of 2008. Made up of players from Enid and the surrounding areas, the team has achieved national ranking status three times, amassing a CFL League Championship in 2012, two Northern Division Championships, and 47 league All-star players, while helping numerous young men gain college athletic scholarships and boasting a 40-13 record in just five years.

Education

As of the 2020 Census, 87% of residents had a high school diploma and 23.3% had a Bachelor's degree or higher. Enid has several institutions of education and is served by seven school districts. They include:
Enid Public Schools
Chisholm Public Schools
Kremlin-Hillsdale Schools
Pioneer-Pleasant Vale Schools
Waukomis Public Schools
Drummond Public Schools
Garber Public Schools

Pioneer-Pleasant Vale's elementary is often referred to as Pleasant Vale Elementary. The Cimarron Montessori School and Summerhill Childrens House are the city's two Montessori style schools.

Several private Christian schools representing a variety of denominations are also located in Enid: Bethel Bible Academy, Emmanuel Christian School, Enid Adventist School, Hillsdale Christian School, Saint Joseph Catholic School, and Saint Paul's Lutheran School. Enid High School, Chisholm High School, and Oklahoma Bible Academy are the city's largest secondary education schools.

Autry Technology Center, one of the CareerTech centers in Oklahoma run by the Oklahoma Department of Career and Technology Education, serves as the city's only vocational education institution. Northern Oklahoma College serves as Enid's community college, and Northwestern Oklahoma State University (NWOSU) provides bachelor and graduate-level education.  Enid was formerly home to Phillips University, which closed in 1998; its campus is now owned by Northern Oklahoma College. Philips University drew Marshallese to Enid in the 1970s.

The Public Library of Enid and Garfield County, established in 1899, also serves as an educational resource for the community. Enid was once home to a Carnegie library, which opened in 1910. After years of funding shortages, the building was condemned in 1957, and the library's current modernist building was opened in 1964.

Media

The Enid News & Eagle is the city's daily newspaper. Historically, the city had 28 newspapers. The Enid Eagle began publication on September 22, 1893. The Enid Daily Wave (later the Enid Morning News) began on December 11, 1893. In February 1923, the papers were combined to form the Enid Publishing Company.

Enid once had two local broadcast television stations. Public-access television station, PEGASYS, was founded in 1986. PEGASYS broadcast on cable channels 11 and 12, and 19. PEGASYS was managed by a non-profit, and aired largely volunteer produced community programming. In 2014 the city of Enid renamed it the Enid Television Network (ETN) and upgraded its broadcast equipment. On December 31, 2019, ETN ceased its cable television broadcasts and transitioned to online streaming.

KXOK-LD, which briefly locally produced programming from Oakwood Mall in the early 2000s, is currently a Retro TV affiliate.

Historically, Enid was home to television station KGEO, an ABC affiliate from July 2, 1954, to 1958 when it moved its transmitter to Oklahoma City, Oklahoma. The station is now KOCO-TV.

KQOB 96.9 FM broadcasts in a classic hits format. Stations KNID 107.1 FM and KOFM 103.1 FM specialize in country music. KKRD 91.1 FM and K226BR 93.1 FM are devoted to religious content. KCRC 1390 AM broadcast sports games. KGWA 960 AM and KZLS 1640 AM is a talk radio station, and KXLS 95.7 FM plays various musical genres.

Infrastructure

Healthcare
Enid has a number of medical clinics and two hospitals. INTEGRIS Bass Baptist Health Center has 207 beds throughout its three facilities. Bass is the oldest hospital in Enid, founded in 1910, and incorporated in 1914 as Enid General Hospital and Training School for Nurses. St. Mary's Regional Medical Center, a 245-bed facility with 127 licensed professionals, was established in 1915 as Enid Springs Sanatorium. Both Enid hospitals are affiliated with the Oklahoma Hospital Association, and their CEOs are FACHE certified.  Clinics include the Garfield County Health Department, and Veterans Affairs Clinic.  Vance Air Force Base Clinic is operated by the 71st Medical Group which consists of the 71st Medical Operations and Support Squadrons.

Transportation

The main highways serving the City of Enid are U.S. Highway 81 Van Buren and U.S. Highway 412 Owen K. Garriott. U.S. Highway 64 runs west down Garriott and U.S. Highway 60 runs east. Both of these highways join together with highway 81 in North Enid, Oklahoma. State Highway 45 also runs through North Enid on Carrier Road.

Railroad development in Garfield County began four years prior to the land opening, and Enid became a central hub within the county, with rail systems running in ten directions. Historical railroads included Enid and Tonkawa Railway, Enid and Anadarko Railway, Blackwell, Enid and Southwestern Railway, Enid Central Railway and the Denver, Enid and Gulf Railroad. Enid's railroad history is displayed at the Railroad Museum of Oklahoma which is housed in the former Santa Fe railroad Depot. The Rock Island Depot is listed on the National Register of Historic Places. Active railroad operations in Enid are Farmrail (FMRC) / Grainbelt Corporation (GNBC), BNSF Railway, and Union Pacific Railroad (UP). In the past Atchison, Topeka & Santa (ATSF), Burlington Northern (BN), Chicago, Rock Island & Pacific (CRIP), Missouri-Kansas-Texas (MKT), North Central Oklahoma and Saint Louis San Francisco "Frisco" (SLSF) connected Enid to the rest of Oklahoma by rail.  Currently, BNSF has given Site Certification to the Easterly Industrial Park three miles east of the City, meaning the railroad has identified the location as an optimal rail-served site meeting ten economic development criteria, intended to minimize development risks customers may face.

From 1907 to 1929, Enid also had its own streetcar system, operated by Enid City Railway. The street cars were later replaced by buses, following a declaration by the Enid government that made streetcars illegal.

Since 1984, the Transit, operated by Enid Public Transportation, has been in operation, providing on-demand shuttle services. The Transit also offers service to Oklahoma City's Will Rogers Airport, Greyhound Bus Service, and Amtrak Train Station.

Airports
Enid Woodring Regional Airport (KWDG) (1167 feet above mean sea level) is located four miles (6 km) southeast of Enid at 36 degrees 22.75 north latitude and 97 degrees 47.47 west longitude. This Class D facility has a  primary runway and a 3149 secondary runway. There is no scheduled air service.
Will Rogers World Airport offers commercial air transportation, about 89 miles to the south.
Vance Air Force Base (KEND) (1,307 feet above mean sea level) is located four miles (6 km) south of the city at 36 degrees 20.21 north latitude and 97 degrees 54.59 west longitude. It was founded in 1941 on land leased by the city of Enid to the United States Army Air Forces, now the United States Air Force. Vance also uses the KWDG facility for military training flights. Since its establishment the base, named after Lt. Col Leon Robert Vance, Jr., has been a major employer in the area.

Utilities
Enid's electricity is provided by Oklahoma Gas & Electric and natural gas by Oklahoma Natural Gas Company. The City of Enid provides water, wastewater, and trash collection services. Internet, television, and telephone providers include Suddenlink Communications, Pioneer Telephone, and AT&T.

Notable people

Enid's Frank Frantz was the seventh and final Oklahoma Territorial Governor. Enid has been home to several successful entrepreneurs from oilman Herbert Champlin to casino owner, Sam Boyd, founder of the Boyd Gaming Corporation.  The arts have also flourished among Enid natives,  from Native American painter Paladine Roye to Pulitzer Prize winning author Marquis James. Three Oklahoma State Poets Laureate, Betty Lou Shipley, Bess Truitt and Carol Hamilton, grew up in Enid. Poets Quraysh Ali Lansana, J. Quinn Brisben, Louis Jenkins, Don Blanding, and D.L. Lang also once called Enid home.

Actors Richard Erdman, Glenda Farrell, Lynn Herring, and Thad Luckinbill were all born in Enid, as was Emmy Award winning director, Sharron Miller. Many musicians have called Enid home, jazz great Sam Rivers, jazz pianist Pat Moran McCoy, folk singer and banjoist Karen Dalton, fingerstyle guitarist Michael Hedges and opera singer Leona Mitchell, with the last two having streets in Enid bearing their names. Mitchell's brother, Hulon Mitchell Jr (Yahweh Ben Yahweh) was the founder of the religious group, Nation of Yahweh.  Attorney Stephen Jones defended Timothy McVeigh after the Oklahoma City bombing.

A number of military heroes have also come from Enid, including former US Army Special Forces operator
Bo Gritz, Medal of Honor recipient Harold Kiner, and Pearl Harbor hero USAF General Kenneth M. Taylor. Enid has a history of aviation professionals from aviation pioneer Clyde Cessna, founder of the Cessna Aircraft Company, to Irving Woodring, one of the Army's Three Musketeers of Aviation. Cessna's pioneering flights earned him the nickname the "Birdman of Enid".  One of Enid's main streets is named after Astronaut Owen K. Garriott, and Enid's air force base is named for Medal of Honor recipient Leon Vance.
Mark Kelly, bass player of the Christian rock band Petra calls Enid home. Former White House photojournalist David Scott Holloway, recipient of the Getty Grant and photographer for Anthony Bourdain: Parts Unknown on CNN was born in Enid, attending Longfellow Jr. High School, before his family moved near Waukomis where he attended Pioneer Pleasantvale High School.

Even some fictional characters hold Enid as their home town, including Paul and Amanda Kirby (portrayed by William Macy and Téa Leoni) in Jurassic Park III, Maggie Gyllenhaal's character, journalist Jean Craddock, in Crazy Heart, and in The Rifleman, Lucas McCain and his son Mark lived in Enid before settling in North Fork, New Mexico Territory.

Some even claim two figures from the Abraham Lincoln assassination lived and died in Enid.  In 1901, Osborn H. Oldroyd wrote The Assassination of Abraham Lincoln Flight, Pursuit (sic), Capture, and Punishment of the Conspirators which claimed that Sgt. Boston Corbett, the man who killed John Wilkes Booth in Virginia, resided in Enid, employed as a medicine salesman.  Local legend holds that Corbett is buried in one of the unmarked graves in the Enid Cemetery. In 1907, Finis L. Bates wrote The Escape and Suicide of John Wilkes Booth. The book claimed that David E. George, a tenant at the Grand Avenue Hotel who committed suicide by poison in 1903, was actually John Wilkes Booth. After sitting for years in Penniman's Funeral Home, George's mummified body later toured the carnival circuit. The 1937 short film The Man in the Barn by Jacques Tourneur revisits the story of David E. George as Booth.

In popular culture
In 2019, the Oklahoma State Chamber of Commerce ranked Enid as "The best Oklahoma city in which to live."

Enid was ranked the 28th best place in the US to raise a family in a 1998 Reader's Digest poll. and in the March 2004 issue of Inc. listed as one of the top 25 small cities in the US for doing business. Good Morning America listed Enid as one of its top five up and coming areas in a January 2006 episode.

Hollywood has come to Enid, shooting scenes from Dillinger in front of the Mark Price Arena and the Grand Saloon, the 1955 short film Holiday for Bands features Enid's Tri-State Music Festival, and portions of the film The Killer Inside Me were filmed in Enid's downtown square. The 2018 film Wildlife was also partially filmed in Enid.

According to television, Enid has been the site of hauntings and exorcisms as  Ghost Lab featured Enid as part of an investigation of sites claimed to be haunted by John Wilkes Booth, and A Current Affair in a segment on expensive religious exorcisms.

Enid is also mentioned in passing in a few popular novels and films. In chapter 12 of The Grapes of Wrath, Enid is one of the towns that feeds into Route 66 from the north via Route 64.

In the CBS series The Big Bang Theory, character Sheldon Cooper contemplates moving to Enid because of its "low crime rate" and "high speed internet" service, but decides against it because the city lacks a model railroad store.'

In the FX series The Americans FBI agent Stan Beeman plans to relocate a family of Soviet defectors to Enid.

Sister city
  Kollo, Niger was declared as Enid's sister city on August 1, 2010, by Mayor John Criner.

References

Further reading
 James, Marquis. Cherokee Strip: A Tale of an Oklahoma Boyhood Viking Press, 1945.
 Marshall, Frank Hamilton. Phillips University's first fifty years (October 9, 1906 – October 9, 1956) Phillips University, 1957.
 Rockwell, Stella, ed., Garfield County, Oklahoma, 1907–1982, Vol. I & II, Garfield Historical Society, Josten's Publishing Company, Topeka, Kansas. 1982.
 Klemme, Michael. Celebrating Enid!, 2010.
 McIntyre, Glen V. Images of America: Enid:1893–1945, Arcadia Publishing, 2012

External links

 
Tourism information

 
Cities in Garfield County, Oklahoma
Cities in Oklahoma
County seats in Oklahoma
Micropolitan areas of Oklahoma